A maggot is the larva of a fly.

Maggot or Maggott may also refer to:

Music
 Maggot (rapper) (born 1976), Welsh rapper
Maggots: The Record, 1987 album by The Plasmatics
The Maggot, a 1999 album by Melvins
"Maggots", a 1990 song by Gwar from Scumdogs of the Universe
"Maggots", a 2000 song by The Screaming Jets from Scam
"Maggot", a 2004 song by Angelspit from Nurse Grenade
"Maggots", a nickname for fans of the band Slipknot; see Vol. 3: (The Subliminal Verses)

Characters
Maggots (Corpse Bride), from the Tim Burton film Corpse Bride
Maggot, a main character in the animated children's program Zombie Hotel
Maggott, a mutant superhero in the Marvel Comics universe
Archer J. Maggott, a character in the film The Dirty Dozen

Other uses
A Maggot, a novel by British author John Fowles, published in 1985
Maggot River (Ontario), former name of the Hewitson River, Ontario, Canada
"Maggots", a curve on the Silverstone Circuit in Great Britain
Missoula Maggots, an amateur Rugby football club

See also
Apple maggot (Rhagoletis pomonella) or railroad worm, a pest of several fruits, mainly apples
Rhagoletis mendax or blueberry maggot 

Magot (disambiguation)